Shanghaied! is the third studio album by New Zealand new wave band Mi-Sex, released in October 1981. The album peaked at number 28 on the Australian Kent Music Report.

Reception

Ian McFarlane described the album as "arguably the band's best album... [which] failed to impress the record-buying public."

Track listing

Charts

References

Mi-Sex albums
CBS Records albums
1981 albums